The National Film Authority Presidential Film Pitch Series is a Film program  organized by the National Film Authority under the umbrella of the Ministry of Tourism, Arts Culture and Creative Arts aimed at reviving the Ghana Film Industry  by creating an enabling platform for Ghanaian film producers with projects to engage with investors, distributors and other international platforms for opportunities. The idea is for the industry to be able to contribute significantly to the economic development of the country. The Presidential pitch series was launched on April 28, 2021, at the Movenpick Ambassador Hotel.

Overview 
The NFA Presidential Film Pitch Series through the Ministry of Tourism, Arts and Culture is expected to yield about 6000 jobs and have urged film makers to also use tourist sites for films, according to Nana Akuffo Addo at the launch of the Pitch Series.  He also added that the Ghana film industry is endowed with many talented players in the ecosystem and the government will continue to implement policies that will make the industry competitive and help create a vibrant market. The platform is also expected to create over 200 films and generate over 40,000 jobs every year.

In this first edition, 25 out of 100 submissions including short films, series, games, documentaries   were shortlisted for the pitch series.

References 

Film organisations in Ghana